Astro TVIQ (formerly known as TVIQ) was an English-language (formerly both hybrid language Malay-language and English-language) channel. This channel was free as it was grouped under the Astro Family package. The viewership target was for children between the age of 4 to 15.

Up until its closure, it was on Astro channel 610. It was available in 3 audio languages such as English, Malay, & Chinese, and provided subtitles in Malay & English. In Indonesia, it was formerly available on channel 20 via Astro Nusantara.

Programmes on this network was all based on education, exploration, arts, handicraft, science, learning, English, motivation, and mathematics.

The programmes that were shown on this channel are taken from a few of the popular international television stations such as from the British Broadcasting Corporation (BBC), Okto (YouTube Only), and programmes from the United States and Australia. Astro TVIQ also broadcast some in-house programmes. For some time in March 2006, some G4 programmes were moved to this channel from TV Pendidikan.

Since January 2010, it has broadcast selected foreign programmes dubbed in Bahasa Malaysia and later added Chinese in February 2009.

From 25 May 2021, this channel was available in HD and their 3 programme blocks (CoolSchool (Sekolahku (Malay)), NightSchool and PlaySchool) were discontinued.

From 1 June 2021, Astro TVIQ only aired English promo of this channel but selected Malay programs still aired on this channel.

After 20 years of broadcasting, Astro TVIQ ceased transmission on 31 January 2022, with programming dispersed to Astro Ceria and TA-DAA!.

Programme blocks (July 2009  May 2021)
CoolSchool  (Malay: Sekolahku) - for educational programs, cartoons and live-action series
NightSchool - For all-night educational shows
PlaySchool - For preschoolers

List of programmes

 Art Factory
 Attack of the Show!
 Backyard Science
 The Big Bang
 The Big Q
 Buzzy Bee & Friends
 Chloe's Closet
 Ciko
 Classic Tales
 Clever
 Clever (Edisi Malaysia)
 Count TV
 Cows and Crayons
 Cyberchase
 Dougie in Disguise
 Dragon Tales
 Dunia Adik @TVIQ
 Didi And Friends
 Eco Adventure Cruise
 The English Room
 Extr@
 Fables by Shapes
 Fabulette
 The Ferals
 Filter
 Finger Tips
  The Fixies (Moved To TA-DAA!)
 Franklin and Friends
 Franny's Feet
 Get Squiggling
 Guess with Jess
 Hana's Helpline
 Hi-5 (also aired on Disney Junior Asia And Formerly By NTV7) 
 Hobby TV
 Hurray for Huckle
 History Hunters  
 Iconicles
 Jobs For Juniors
 Keep It Wild
 Kerjaya Impian (also aired on Astro Tutor TV SPM)
 Kid Detectives
 Kids World @TVIQ
 Lab Rats Challenge
 Learning English with Osmo
 Living English
 Look Ahead
 The Magic School Bus
 Milly, Molly
 Mind Blowing Breakthroughs
 Mouse TV
 Mr Moon
 Mya Go
 My Friend Rabbit
 Numberjacks
 Oh My English! (English and Malay) (also aired on Astro Ceria, Astro Mustika HD and Astro Maya HD Until 31 January 2022 Moved To Astro Ceria And TA-DAA!)
 Olive and The Rhyme Rescue Crew
 Open University
 Ozie Boo!
 PAW Patrol
 Peppa Pig
 Pippi Longstocking
 Poko
 Puzzle Maths
 Raggs
 Real Life 101
 Robbie and the Book of Tales
 Sagwa, the Chinese Siamese Cat
 Study English
 Super Simple Songs
 Super Why!
 STEMSasi!
 Teen I Q
 Tork
 Tikkabilla
 Xfresh TV
 X-Play
 Zumbers

See also
 List of Malaysian television stations
 Astro
 TV Pendidikan

References

External links

Astro Malaysia Holdings television channels
Television channels and stations established in 2002
Television channels and stations disestablished in 2022
2002 establishments in Malaysia
2022 disestablishments in Malaysia